Miss World 2019, the 69th edition of the Miss World pageant, was held on 14 December 2019 at the ExCeL London in London, United Kingdom. Vanessa Ponce of Mexico crowned her successor Toni-Ann Singh of Jamaica at the end of the event.

Background

Location and date 
The official announcement was made on 19 February 2019, in Bangkok, by Miss World President Julia Morley, CEO Tanawat Wansom of TW Pageants, and guest Ashwani Kumar Rai. They announced a mid-December date for the contest. However, on 2 July 2019, Morley and Vanessa Ponce, the reigning Miss World, appeared on ITV's Good Morning Britain with Piers Morgan. Morley officially announced that the pageant will be held on Saturday, 14 December 2019, at ExCeL London and that Miss World 2020 will be held in Thailand in order to celebrate Miss World's 70th anniversary. The 2019 opening ceremony was held in London on 20 November. Contestants then competed in a series of fast track events around London.

Result

Continental Queens of Beauty

Judges
The judges' panel for Miss World 2019 were:
 Julia Morley – Chairman of the Miss World Pageant Organization
 Piers Morgan – TV presenter, talk show host, a former judge at Britain's Got Talent and America's Got Talent
 Mike Dixon – Musical Director
 Deborah Lambie – Miss World New Zealand 2015 
 Dame Zandra Rhodes – London Fashion designer
 Marsha-Rae Ratcliff, OBE
 Svestoslav Kolchagov, Creative Director and Designer of KolchagovBarba
 Emilio Barba, Creative Director and Designer of KolchagovBarba
 Lady Wilnelia Forsyth – Miss World 1975 from Puerto Rico
 Ksenia Sukhinova – Miss World 2008 from Russia
 Carina Tyrrell – Miss England 2014
 Kamal Ibrahim – Mister World 2010 from Ireland

Challenge Events

Head-to-Head Challenge

Round 1
  Advanced to Round 2 of the Head-to-Head Challenge.
  Advanced to Round 2 of the Head-to-Head Challenge, but advanced to the Top 40 via judges' choice or a challenge event other than Head-to-Head Challenge.
  Advanced to the Top 40 via a challenge event other than Head-to-Head Challenge.
  Advanced to the Top 40 via judges' choice.

Round 2
  Advanced to the Top 40 via the Head-to-Head challenge.

Top Model
Miss Nigeria Nyekachi Douglas won  Top Model Competition and become the fourth quarter-finalist of Miss World 2019.
{| class="wikitable sortable" style="font-size:95%;"
! Final result
! Contestant
|-
|  Winner  
|
 - Nyekachi Douglas
|-
| 1st Runner-Up|
  – Lương Thùy Linh
|-
| 2nd Runner-Up| – Suman Rao
|-
| 3rd Runner-Up| – Ophély Mézino
|-
| 4th Runner-Up| – Oliver Nakakande
|-
| Top 10|
  – Elis Miele – Denisa Spergerová – Lila Lam – Madina Batyk – Tya Jané Ramey
|-
| Top 40|
  – Taqiyyah Francis
  – Judit Grnja
  – Sarah Marschke
  – Che Amor Greenidge
  – Ivana Ladan
  – Li Peishan
  – Katarina Mamić
  – Natasja Kunde
  – Alba Marie Blair
  – Dana Mononen
  – Alysha Morency
  – Krisztina Nagypál
  – Princess Megonondo
  – Adele Sammartino
  – Toni-Ann Singh
  – Maria Wavinya
  – Yu Yanan
  – Ashley Alvídrez
  – Elizaveta Kuznitova
  – Mirjana Muratović
  – Michelle Dee
  – Milena Sadowska
  – Daniella Rodríguez
  – Alina Sanko
  – Frederika Kurtulíková
  – Mariah Joseph Maget
  – Simay Rasimoğlu
  – Marharyta Pasha
  – Isabella Rodríguez
  – Gabriella Jukes
|}

Sports
Miss British Virgin Islands Rikkiya Brathwaite won the Sports Competition and became the first quarter-finalist of Miss World 2019.

Talent
Miss Jamaica, Toni-Ann Singh, was the winner of the Talent Competition and became the second quarter-finalist of Miss World 2019.

Multimedia
Miss Nepal, Anushka Shrestha, was the winner of the Multimedia Competition and became the third quarter-finalist of Miss World 2019.

Beauty With A Purpose
For the first time, all 10 finalists were placed in the Top 40 of Miss World 2019 due to their impressive projects and initiatives. Miss Nepal, Anushka Shrestha, received the award and will receive funding from the Miss World Organization for the establishment of her project.

Contestants
111 delegates have been confirmed.

Notes

Returns
Last competed in 2006:
 Last competed in 2015:
 Last competed in 2016:
    Last competed in 2017:
   Designation

Replacements

 Withdrawals 

  – Larissa Robitschko did not compete in Miss World or Miss Universe after the Miss Austria Organization relinquished the local franchise.
  – The Miss Lebanon 2019 pageant was postponed several times then ultimately canceled, citing the country's political unrest.
  – Palesa Makara
  – Valerie Mille Binguira 
  – Sanja Lovčević
 ''' – The Miss World Zimbabwe 2019 pageant was canceled, citing the country's economic crisis.

References

External links
 

Miss World
2019 beauty pageants
Beauty pageants in England
2019 in London